Kingdom of Gypsies (Arabic: مملكة الغجر) is an Egyptian television serial. It debuted during Ramadan on May 6, 2019 and lasted for 30 episodes. The series stars former Miss Egypt, Horeya Farghaly, and actress/dancer Fifi Abdou. The cast also includes Abdou's real-life daughter Azza Mujahid.

The series was subject to censorship from the government of Abdel Fattah el-Sisi. Kingdom of Gypsies was cited for breaking Egyptian censorship rules 105 times. The series was accused of including prohibited content such as the use of English words, depictions of violence and sexual innuendo.

Production
The original name of the drama was Yasmina, but the production team changed it to Yasmina and the Queen of the Gypsies. The title was then changed to Kingdom of the Gypsies.

Cast
Horeya Farghaly
Fifi Abdou
Nour Fakhry
Zainab Abdel Wahab
Azza Mujahid
Ghafran Muhamad
Husam Al-Jandaa
Sameh Al-Saryy
Mayar Al-Gheity
Hazem Samir
Ahmed Karara
Mohamed Hamza

See also
 List of Egyptian television series

References

Egyptian drama television series
2019 Egyptian television series debuts
2019 Egyptian television series endings
Arabic-language television shows